Altiyan Childs is the self-titled debut studio album by 2010 X Factor Australia winner Altiyan Childs. The album was released in Australia on 10 December 2010. It features selected songs that Childs performed as part of the top twelve on The X Factor, including the winner's single "Somewhere in the World".

The song was made available for download following his win on the X Factor on 22 November 2010. "Somewhere in the World" debuted on the ARIA Singles Chart at number eight and also made its debut in New Zealand at number five. The album debuted on the ARIA Albums Chart at number four and certified platinum by the Australian Recording Industry Association. In New Zealand, it reached number three and also certified platinum.

Background
The album was recorded six days after becoming the winner of the second series of The X Factor. It features his highly praised performances of "Livin' on a Prayer", "Eye of the Tiger", "Beautiful Day", "Summer of '69" and the winner's single, "Somewhere in the World". The album does not include Childs' week two performance of Prince's song "Kiss". The single "Somewhere in the World" was written for the final four contestants on The X Factor by Andrew Dorff, Michael Busbee and Klaus Derendorf, who was the producer of the song.

Singles
"Somewhere in the World" was made available as a download-only single following Childs' win on The X Factor on 22 November 2010. It made its first chart appearance in Australia at number eight on the ARIA Singles Chart. In New Zealand, "Somewhere in the World" debuted on the New Zealand Singles Chart at number five.

Charts and certification

Charts

Year-end charts

Certifications

Track listing

Release history

References

ARIA Award-winning albums
Altiyan Childs albums
2010 debut albums
Sony Music Australia albums